A floating airport is an airport built and situated on a very large floating structure (VLFS) located many miles out at sea utilizing a flotation type of device or devices such as pneumatic stabilized platform (PSP) technology.

As the population increases and land becomes more expensive and scarce, very large floating structures (VLFS) such as floating airports could help solve land use, pollution and aircraft noise issues.

Early history
The first discussion of a floating airport was for trans-Atlantic flights. At that time a passenger aircraft capable of making the trip could be built, but because of the massive need for fuel for the flight, it had a limited payload. An article appeared in the January 1930 issue of Popular Mechanics in which a model of a floating airport located in the Atlantic was proposed. To make safe flight possible with the aviation technology of that time, it called for eight such airports in the Atlantic. But unlike future floating airport ideas which were free floating, this 1930 concept had a floating airport platform, but with stabilizer legs which prevent the flight deck from pitching and rolling, similar in concept to some of today's off shore oil rigs. The cost of establishing eight such floating airports in 1930 was estimated at approximately USD$12,000,000 . The idea of floating airports received fresh attention in 1935 when the famous French aviation pilot and builder Bleriot gave one of his last interviews in which he made the case for installing some mid-Atlantic; he called them Seadromes as a solution to economical trans-Atlantic passenger flights.

Description
In theory, issues and problems of land-based airports could be minimized by locating airports several miles off the coast. Takeoffs and landings would be over water, not over populated areas, thereby eliminating noise pollution and reducing risks of aircraft crashes to the land-locked population.

Since little of the ocean's surface is currently being used for human activity, growth and alterations in configuration would be relatively easy to achieve with minimal impact to the environment or to local residents who would utilize the airport. Water taxis or other high speed surface vessels would be a part of an offshore mass transit system that could connect the floating airport to coastal communities and minimize traffic issues.

A floating structure, such as a floating airport, is theorized to have less impact on the environment than the land-based alternative. It would not require much, if any, dredging or moving of mountains or clearing of green space and the floating structure provides a reef-like environment conducive to marine life. In theory, wave energy could be harnessed, using the structure to convert waves into energy to help sustain the energy needs of the airport.

Modern Floating airport projects

In 2000, the Japanese Ministry of Land, Infrastructure, and Transport sponsored the construction of Mega-Float, a 1000-metre floating runway in Tokyo Bay. After conducting several real aircraft landings, the Ministry concluded that floating runways' hydro-elastic response would not affect aircraft operations, including precision instrument approaches in a protected waterway such as a large bay. The structure has been dismantled and is no longer in use.

The pneumatic stabilized platform (PSP) was proposed as a means for constructing a new floating airport for San Diego in the Pacific Ocean, at least three miles off the tip of Point Loma. However, this proposed design was rejected in October 2003 due to very high cost, the difficulty in accessing such an airport, the difficulty in transporting jet fuel, electricity, water, and gas to the structure, failure to address security concerns such as a bomb blast, inadequate room for high-speed exits and taxiways, and environmental concerns.

Achmad Yani International Airport, the first floating airport in the world started construction on 17 June 2014, and was completed in 2018. However, only the passenger terminal and apron are floating.

See also

Lily and Clover
 Aerospace architecture

References

External links
 Center for Contemporary Conflict - "The Atlantis Garrison: A Comprehensive, Cost Effective Cargo and Port Security Strategy" by Dr. Michael J. Hillyard(PSP / Floating Airport technology could be used for Cost Effective Cargo & Port Security)
 September 1996 -"Floating Airports: Wave of the Future"
 November 18, 1999 by Michael McCabe, SF Chronicle Staff Writer "Planes would land on floating runways built on S.F. Bay"
Centre National De La Recherche Scientifique "Floatport: a floating solution to the San Diego airport's environmental problems" Auteur(s)/Author(s)BLOOD H.; INNIS D., Float Inc., San Diego CA, ETATS-UNIS
 San Diego Union Tribune - SignOnSanDiego.com "Floating airport proposal resurfaces"
Jim Bell - Ecological Designer "Airport: Thinking Outside the Box"
 9/26/2005 USAToday.com "Today in the Sky: Will San Diego build an airport in the ocean?" by Ben Mutzabaugh
 San Diego CityBEAT, "The sinking of the San Diego floating airport proposal" by D.A. Kolodenko

Airports by type
Ship types
Structural engineering
Building engineering
Naval architecture